Mario Sergio Cortella (born March 5, 1954) is a Brazilian philosopher, writer, educator and speaker most known for putting into the public sphere and helping popularize in questions related to philosophy in Brazilian contemporary society. He is also known as a prominent educator. Having studied with Paulo Freire, Cortella applied Freire's approach to education while he was secretary of education of São Paulo city during the '90s. He is professor of theological philosophy at PUC-SP.

Early life
He was born in Londrina, Paraná. In 1973/1974 he experienced the monastic life in a convent of the Discalced Carmelite Order, but abandoned the prospect of becoming a monk for an academic career. He graduated in 1975 at the Faculty of Philosophy our Lady Mediatrix.

Career 
He is a full professor in the Department of Theology and Religious Studies and Graduate Education at PUC-SP, beginning in 1977 and visiting professor at Fundação Dom Cabral since 1997. He was in the GVPEC Fundação Getúlio Vargas between 1998 and 2010.

He held the post of Municipal Secretary of Education of São Paulo (1991–1992) during the Erundina administration and was a member of CAPES/Education Ministry Technical Scientific Council of Basic Education (2008/2010).

He hosted the program Naughty Dialogues on TV PUC, the University Channel program.

Publications
Cortella has published works in the field of philosophy and education. He is the author, among other works, of:

A Escola e o Conhecimento: fundamentos epistemológicos e políticos
Nos Labirintos da Moral, com Yves de La Taille
Não Espere Pelo Epitáfio: Provocações Filosóficas
Não Nascemos Prontos!
Viver em Paz para Morrer em Paz: Paixão, Sentido e Felicidade
Não se desespere! Provocações filosóficas
Sobre a Esperança: Diálogo, com Frei Betto
O que é a Pergunta?, Com Silmara Casadei
Política: Para Não Ser Idiota, com Renato Janine Ribeiro
Vida e Carreira: um equilíbrio possível?, com Pedro Mandelli
Educação e Esperança: sete reflexões breves para recusar o biocídio
Qual é a tua Obra? Inquietações Propositivas sobre Gestão, Liderança e Ética
Vivemos Mais! Vivemos Bem? Por Uma Vida Plena
Liderança em Foco
Ética e Vergonha na Cara!, com Clóvis de Barros Filho
Pensar Bem Nos Faz Bem!
Descartes, a paixão pela razão

See also
 Christian philosophy
 Philosophy of religion

References

1954 births
20th-century Brazilian educators
21st-century Brazilian educators
Brazilian educational theorists
Brazilian educators
Critical pedagogy
Critical theorists
Living people
Philosophers of education
Pontifical Catholic University of São Paulo
Popular education
Catholic philosophers
People from Londrina
Former members of Catholic religious institutes